The Porcupine mine is one of the largest gold mines in Canada and in the world. The mine is located in Timmins, Ontario. The mine has estimated reserves of 4.35 million oz (123.32 tonnes) of gold.

See also
List of gold mines in Canada

References

Gold mines in Ontario
Mines in Timmins